Stephen J. Mallozzi (born January 15, 2001) is an American professional stock car racing driver. He last competed part-time in the NASCAR Camping World Truck Series, driving the No. 43 Toyota Tundra for Reaume Brothers Racing. He is also a development driver for RBR, competing in late model racing for the team. He also works as a commentator and analyst for multiple sports teams at the University of Virginia (where he is a student), a commentator for go-kart racing, and is also a staff writer for NASCAR news website TobyChristie.com.

Racing career
Mallozzi started his career at age 9 racing go-karts and would go on to win multiple Northeast Karting Championships and score multiple national podium finishes.

Mallozzi first joined Reaume Brothers Racing as a pit crew member for their NASCAR Camping World Truck Series team. In July 2021, he and Jonathan Cuevas (another RBR crew member) became the first two drivers to be a part of RBR's driver development program. He would compete in late model racing events for RBR at Hickory Motor Speedway, Florence Speedway and Dillon Speedway. He would also continue to work for the team.

On June 23, 2022, it was announced that Mallozzi would make his Truck Series debut in the race at Mid-Ohio for Reaume Brothers Racing in their No. 43 truck.

On July 8, 2022, Mallozzi would wreck during the practice session at Mid-Ohio. Following the session, Mallozzi called G2G Racing the 'Biggest Joke of a racing organization in NASCAR' after the #46 truck blew an oil line on track, which sent Mallozzi into the turn nine tire barrier. RBR, without a backup car, was forced to make repairs to the damaged truck. Mallozzi would qualify 36th.

The following day, Mallozzi would finish 22nd in his debut event, the best out of the five drivers making their Truck Series debut, and one of Reaume Brother's best finishes of the year. He was visibly emotional following the event, stating the significance of the finish and the uncertainty of his racing future in an interview with TobyChristie.com reporter Taylor Kitchen.

Media career
As a student at the University of Virginia, Mallozzi has been an analyst and a commentator for several sports teams at the university (for student news organization WUVA and the ACC Network) as well as go-kart racing. He has worked as an analyst for the UVA men's basketball team. Mallozzi's first game as a commentator (in-game) was a field hockey game between the University of Louisville and the University of Virginia in October 2020. He has also commentated for the University of Virginia's women's lacrosse and soccer teams.

Since 2022, Mallozzi has worked for TobyChristie.com as the writer of their articles on eNASCAR and Esports racing events. The website is one of his late model sponsors.

Personal life
Mallozzi was born in Voorhees, New Jersey on January 15, 2001, to Melissa and Stephen A. Mallozzi.

Mallozzi attended and graduated Salesianum High School in Delaware. He worked numerous jobs during high school, ranging from pizza delivery driver to fry cook in order to save money to race. Mallozzi currently works as a part-time server at Outback Steakhouse.

In order to work for and drive for NASCAR teams, Mallozzi moved from his hometown of Swedesboro, New Jersey to Mooresville, North Carolina, which is in the Charlotte metropolitan area where most NASCAR teams are located. Mallozzi quickly developed a close relationship with Josh Reaume, who would commit to helping Mallozzi achieve his dream of a NASCAR national series start.

His father has terminal lung cancer. After his father's diagnosis, Mallozzi had to take a temporary hiatus from racing. Mallozzi has publicly stated that a large reason for his return to racing was due to his father's condition, acknowledging that if he didn't do it now his dad might never get to see it.

Mallozzi attends the University of Virginia and is majoring in economics. He is scheduled to graduate early in the fall of 2022.

Motorsports career results

NASCAR
(key) (Bold – Pole position awarded by qualifying time. Italics – Pole position earned by points standings or practice time. * – Most laps led.)

Camping World Truck Series

 Season still in progress

References

External links
 

2001 births
Living people
NASCAR drivers
People from Swedesboro, New Jersey
Sportspeople from Gloucester County, New Jersey
Racing drivers from New Jersey